Musgrave is a surbub in Durban, South Africa. It is inland, west of the Durban city centre, and forms part of Berea. Musgrave Centre, a large shopping centre is found in the area.

References

Suburbs of Durban